The River Girl (Italian: La donna del fiume) is a 1955 French-Italian melodrama film directed by Mario Soldati and starring Sophia Loren, Gérard Oury and Rik Battaglia.

Plot
After discovering that she is pregnant, a peasant girl is deserted by her lover. In revenge she reports him to the police and customs officers for smuggling.

Cast
Sophia Loren as Nives Mangolini
Rik Battaglia as  Gino Lodi
Gérard Oury as  Enzo Cinti
 Lise Bourdin as  Tosca
 Enrico Olivieri as  Oscar 
 Maria Conventi as Ivana 
 Franco Polegatti as Chioggia 
 Nino Marchetti  as Carabinieri Marshal
 Mimmo Palmara	
 Guido Celano

Gallery

References

External links

1955 films
Italian drama films
French drama films
1955 drama films
1950s Italian-language films
Films set in Emilia-Romagna
Films produced by Dino De Laurentiis
Films produced by Carlo Ponti
Columbia Pictures films
Films directed by Mario Soldati
Lux Film films
Minerva Film films
Melodrama films
1950s Italian films
1950s French films